A.F.C. Cardiff was a football club based in Cardiff, Wales. It was founded as Lake United during the 1960s before being renamed A.F.C. Cardiff in 1984.

After winning back-to-back promotions between 1979 and 1981, moving from the Second Division to the Premier Division, the club won the Welsh Football League Cup in 1984 and were champions of the Welsh Football League Division Two (then known as the "Welsh Football League Premier Division") in 1987, winning promotion to the Welsh National League. It was dissolved in 1990, when it merged with Sully F.C. to form Inter Cardiff F.C.

Honours

League
Welsh Football League Premier Division
Champions: 1986–87
Runners-up: 1985–86
Welsh Football League Division One
Runners-up: 1980–81
Welsh Football League Division Two
Champions: 1979–80

Cups
Welsh Football League Cup
Champions: 1984
Runners-up: 1987

See also
Inter Cardiff F.C.
Cardiff Metropolitan University F.C.

Notes
  as Lake United F.C.

References

Football clubs in Wales
Football clubs in Cardiff
Association football clubs established in 1972
Association football clubs disestablished in 1990
1990 disestablishments in Wales
Welsh Football League clubs